Oru Oorla Rendu Rajakumari ( Two princess in a town) is a 2021-2022 Indian Tamil-language family drama on Zee Tamil and streams on ZEE5. It premiered on 25 October 2021 and ended on November,12,2022 and stars Ashwini Radhakrishna, who acts the role Rasathi in both the seasons. It is a sequel of Oru Oorla Oru Rajakumari after 6 year leap and this second season again took 16 year leap.

The series premiered along with Sathya 2, by ending their first seasons on 24 October 2021 and starting the second seasons on the next day 25 October 2021. and ended on 12 November 2022 with 321 episodes.

Synopsis

Before leap
After some struggles, Rasathi and Iniyan blessed with girl baby named Bhoomika, while Kanmani and Kumaran blessed with girl baby named Swetha. Rasathi's daughter is cute, while Kanmani's daughter is attractive. But Maragatham love Rasathi's daughter more because the truth is she swapped the babies of Rasathi and Kanmani. Now Rasathi and Iniyan were the biological parents of Swetha where Kanmani and Kumaran are the biological parents of Bhoomika. One day the truth reveals and Maragatham decides to separate Swetha from Rasathi with the help of Kanmani. So they escaped the from that place with Swetha and lived in another city.

After leap
After 16 years, Rasathi blessed with twin babies and she worried about Swetha's missing. Now Kanmani, Maragatham and Bhoomika treated Swetha as a servant in their house. Can Rasathi and Swetha meets forms rest of the story.

Cast

Before leap
Main
 Ashwini Radhakrishna as Rasathi Iniyan: Iniyan's wife; Swetha's biological mother and Bhoomika's adoptive mother 
 Puviarasu as Iniyan: Rasathi's husband; Swetha's biological father;  Bhoomika's adoptive father
 Sahasraa as Bhoomika: Rasathi and Iniyan's adoptive daughter; Kanmani and Kumaran's biological daughter
 Meghna Mrithika as Swetha: Rasathi and Iniyan's biological daughter; Kanmani and Kumaran's adoptive daughter

Others
 Swathi Royal as Kanmani: Kumaran's wife; Bhoomika's biological mother and Swetha's adoptive mother
 Vishnukanth as Kumaran: Kanmani's husband; Bhoomika's biological father and Swetha's adoptive father 
 Dhipa Nethran as Mangai: Iniyan's mother
 Prabhakaran Chandran as Paarivendan: Mangai's husband
 Bindhu Aneesh as Maragatham: Kumaran and Punitha's mother
 Ravi Varma as Nesamani: Maragatham's husband
 Saira Banu as  Punitha: Maragatham's daughter
 Sudharsanam as  Kabilan: Rasathi's younger brother and Punitha's husband
 Siva Devi as Kokila: Kanmani's mother
 Vijayakumar as Nattamai (cameo appearance)

After leap
Main
 Ashwini Radhakrishna in a dual role as 
 Rasathi: Swetha's mother 
 Swetha: Rasathi's elder daughter, Maddy's wife
 Indhu Chowdary as Bhoomika: Kanmani's daughter, Gowtham's wife
 Ayub VJ as Madhavan (Maddy): Prakash and Gowtham's brother, Swetha's Husband
 Santhosh as Gowtham: Prakash and Maddy's brother, Bhoomika's husband

Others
 Sivaranjini as Kanmani 
 Uma Rani as Maragatham
 Ravi Varma as Nesamani
 Siva Devi as Kokila: Kanmani's mother
 Uvesri as Kalpana: Prakash, Gowtham and Maddy's mother
 Poovilangu Mohan as Shivashankaran: Prakash, Gowtham and Maddy's father
 Shalini Rajan as Preethi: Shivashankaran and Kalpana's daughter
 Dhachayani as Shreya: Rasathi's youngest daughter
 Abishek Rathan as Shiva: Rasathi's son
 Revathy Gnanamurugan as Ragini: Prakash's wife
 Prakash Rajan as Prakash: Ragini's husband 
 Geetha Saraswathi as Shenbakavally: Rasathi's mother, Swetha's grandmother 
 Nila Gracy as Shruthi: Ragini's sister
 Varnika Dhiya as Kousalya: Ragini's and Shruthi's mother
 Chandru as Rajasekar: Ragini's and Shruthi's father

References

External links 
 Oru Oorla Rendu Rajakumari at ZEE5
 

Zee Tamil original programming
Tamil-language television shows
Tamil-language romance television series
2021 Tamil-language television series debuts
Tamil-language sequel television series
2021 Tamil-language television seasons
Television shows set in Tamil Nadu
2022 Tamil-language television series endings